Tutan may refer to:
 Tutan, Kerman
 Tutan, Sistan and Baluchestan
 , an indigenous boat made of tobacco leaves found in the Hamun Lake region